Uncheon station is a station of Gwangju Metro Line 1 in Ssangchon-dong, Seo District, Gwangju, South Korea.

Station name
The station was originally known as Honam University Entrance Station were the Honam University is nearby and later it was decided to rename as Uncheon (Honam University Entrance) Station. On April 22, 2015, the name of the station was rename into Uncheon Station as the Honam University Ssangchon Campus was integrated with the Mining Campus.

Station layout

Exits

External links
  Cyber station information from Gwangju Metropolitan Rapid Transit Corporation
  Cyber station information from Gwangju Metropolitan Rapid Transit Corporation

Gwangju Metro stations
Seo District, Gwangju
Railway stations opened in 2004
2004 establishments in South Korea